Haxey is a town and civil parish on the Isle of Axholme in North Lincolnshire, England. It is directly south of Epworth, south-west of Scunthorpe, north-west of Gainsborough, east of Doncaster and north-west of Lincoln, with a population of 4,584 at the 2011 census. The town was regarded as the historic capital of the Isle of Axholme.

Haxey lies between the villages of Westwoodside and Owston Ferry, part of the Isle of Axholme, and is notable for Haxey Hood, a local event with over 700 years of history.

Geography

Haxey is on one of a series of low-lying hills which reach a maximum height of  out of the surrounding marshland. The River Trent lies to the east, beyond Owston Ferry.

The civil parish includes the town of Haxey and village of Westwoodside, and the hamlets of High Burnham (the highest elevation of the Isle of Axholme), Low Burnham, East Lound, Graizelound and Upperthorpe which is conjoined to Westwoodside.

Community
Haxey, previously the capital of the Isle of Axholme, was destroyed by fire in 1741.

The town's Grade I listed Anglican parish church, dedicated to St Nicholas, originates from the 12th and 13th centuries. It is of mainly Perpendicular Gothic style. The tower is of three stages, with an embattled parapet. Piers of the north arcade are Norman, and those of the south, with the chancel arch and chantry chapel, mainly Early English.

Haxey has a Church of England primary school and a private day nursery.

The town contains three public houses, The Duke William, The Loco and The King's Arms, two convenience stores, a doctor's surgery, and a local estate agency. Lincolnshire Co-op opened a £1.2 million store in 2013 to some local opposition over loss of town character and other businesses. In 2018, an application was submitted to demolish the Duke William pub – which was subsequently revised to retain the frontage of the historic building housing the pub.

Thomas Buckle was born here in 1886. He is known throughout the area as the original champion of the Haxey Hood. There is a plaque in the local pub The King's Arms dedicated to his efforts, as well as a small charity-run museum located near the church, the site of his original home.

Transport
Haxey is served by buses provided by Isle Coaches, Stagecoach Buses and First South Yorkshire which give the town services to towns like Doncaster, Scunthorpe and Epworth.
The town was served by three railway stations. The central one was Haxey Town on the Axholme Joint Railway which ran from Goole to Lincoln via a connecting spur to the Doncaster to Lincoln Line. The station closed to passengers in 1933 and the line closing to freight and excursion services in 1956. The site forms a trail between Belton and Haxey. Another station was opened north on the Doncaster to Lincoln Line on the outskirts of the town. It closed in 1933 too. However, the other station named Haxey and Epworth closed in 1964 lasting longer than the previous stations. The nearest mainline stations are now in the nearby town of Crowle and Gainsborough Lea Road.

References

External links

Haxey on the Axholme.info site
Haxey, Genuki.org.uk. Retrieved 24 July 2011
"Haxey", The Isle of Axholme Family History Society. Retrieved 24 July 2011
Haxey Parish Council website, Retrieved 24 July 2011

Villages in the Borough of North Lincolnshire
Civil parishes in Lincolnshire